Rhetoric is the art of persuasion, which along with grammar and logic (or dialectic), is one of the three ancient arts of discourse. Rhetoric aims to study the techniques writers or speakers utilize to inform, persuade, or motivate particular audiences in specific situations. Aristotle defines rhetoric as "the faculty of observing in any given case the available means of persuasion" and since mastery of the art was necessary for victory in a case at law, for passage of proposals in the assembly, or for fame as a speaker in civic ceremonies, he calls it "a combination of the science of logic and of the ethical branch of politics". Rhetoric typically provides heuristics for understanding, discovering, and developing arguments for particular situations, such as Aristotle's three persuasive audience appeals: logos, pathos, and ethos. The five canons of rhetoric or phases of developing a persuasive speech were first codified in classical Rome: invention, arrangement, style, memory, and delivery.

From Ancient Greece to the late 19th century, rhetoric played a central role in Western education in training orators, lawyers, counsellors, historians, statesmen, and poets.

Uses

Scope

Scholars have debated the scope of rhetoric since ancient times. Although some have limited rhetoric to the specific realm of political discourse, many modern scholars liberate it to encompass every aspect of culture. Contemporary studies of rhetoric address a much more diverse range of domains than was the case in ancient times. While classical rhetoric trained speakers to be effective persuaders in public forums and institutions such as courtrooms and assemblies, contemporary rhetoric investigates human discourse writ large. Rhetoricians have studied the discourses of a wide variety of domains, including the natural and social sciences, fine art, religion, journalism, digital media, fiction, history, cartography, and architecture, along with the more traditional domains of politics and the law.

Because the ancient Greeks highly valued public political participation, rhetoric emerged as a crucial tool to influence politics. Consequently, rhetoric remains associated with its political origins. However, even the original instructors of Western speech—the Sophists—disputed this limited view of rhetoric. According to the Sophists, such as Gorgias, a successful rhetorician could speak convincingly on any topic, regardless of his experience in that field. This method suggested rhetoric could be a means of communicating any expertise, not just politics. In his Encomium to Helen, Gorgias even applied rhetoric to fiction by seeking for his own pleasure to prove the blamelessness of the mythical Helen of Troy in starting the Trojan War.

Looking to another key rhetorical theorist, Plato defined the scope of rhetoric according to his negative opinions of the art. He criticized the Sophists for using rhetoric as a means of deceit instead of discovering truth. In "Gorgias", one of his Socratic Dialogues, Plato defines rhetoric as the persuasion of ignorant masses within the courts and assemblies. Rhetoric, in Plato's opinion, is merely a form of flattery and functions similarly to cookery, which masks the undesirability of unhealthy food by making it taste good. Thus, Plato considered any speech of lengthy prose aimed at flattery as within the scope of rhetoric. Some scholars, however, contest the idea that Plato despised rhetoric and instead view his dialogues as a dramatization of complex rhetorical principles.

Aristotle both redeemed rhetoric from his teacher and narrowed its focus by defining three genres of rhetoric—deliberative, forensic or judicial, and epideictic. Yet, even as he provided order to existing rhetorical theories, Aristotle extended the definition of rhetoric, calling it the ability to identify the appropriate means of persuasion in a given situation, thereby making rhetoric applicable to all fields, not just politics. When one considers that rhetoric included torture (in the sense that the practice of torture is a form of persuasion or coercion), it is clear that rhetoric cannot be viewed only in academic terms. However, the enthymeme based upon logic (especially, based upon the syllogism) was viewed as the basis of rhetoric.

However, since the time of Aristotle, logic has changed. For example, Modal logic has undergone a major development that also modifies rhetoric.  Yet, Aristotle also outlined generic constraints that focused the rhetorical art squarely within the domain of public political practice. He restricted rhetoric to the domain of the contingent or probable: those matters that admit multiple legitimate opinions or arguments.

The contemporary neo-Aristotelian and neo-Sophistic positions on rhetoric mirror the division between the Sophists and Aristotle. Neo-Aristotelians generally study rhetoric as political discourse, while the neo-Sophistic view contends that rhetoric cannot be so limited. Rhetorical scholar Michael Leff characterizes the conflict between these positions as viewing rhetoric as a "thing contained" versus a "container". The neo-Aristotelian view threatens the study of rhetoric by restraining it to such a limited field, ignoring many critical applications of rhetorical theory, criticism, and practice. Simultaneously, the neo-Sophists threaten to expand rhetoric beyond a point of coherent theoretical value.

Over the past century, people studying rhetoric have tended to enlarge its object domain beyond speech texts.  Kenneth Burke asserted humans use rhetoric to resolve conflicts by identifying shared characteristics and interests in symbols. By nature, humans engage in identification, either to assign oneself or another to a group. This definition of rhetoric as identification broadened the scope from strategic and overt political persuasion to the more implicit tactics of identification found in an immense range of sources.

Among the many scholars who have since pursued Burke's line of thought, James Boyd White sees rhetoric as a broader domain of social experience in his notion of constitutive rhetoric. Influenced by theories of social construction, White argues that culture is "reconstituted" through language. Just as language influences people, people influence language. Language is socially constructed, and depends on the meanings people attach to it. Because language is not rigid and changes depending on the situation, the very usage of language is rhetorical. An author, White would say, is always trying to construct a new world and persuading his or her readers to share that world within the text.

People engage in the rhetorical process anytime they speak or produce meaning. Even in the field of science, the practices of which were once viewed as being merely the objective testing and reporting of knowledge, scientists must persuade their audience to accept their findings by sufficiently demonstrating that their study or experiment was conducted reliably and resulted in sufficient evidence to support their conclusions.

The vast scope of rhetoric is difficult to define; however, political discourse remains, in many ways, the paradigmatic example for studying and theorizing specific techniques and conceptions of persuasion, considered by many a synonym for "rhetoric".

As a civic art
Throughout European History, rhetoric has concerned itself with persuasion in public and political settings such as assemblies and courts. Because of its associations with democratic institutions, rhetoric is commonly said to flourish in open and democratic societies with rights of free speech, free assembly, and political enfranchisement for some portion of the population. Those who classify rhetoric as a civic art believe that rhetoric has the power to shape communities, form the character of citizens and greatly affect civic life.

Rhetoric was viewed as a civic art by several of the ancient philosophers. Aristotle and Isocrates were two of the first to see rhetoric in this light. In his work, Antidosis, Isocrates states, "We have come together and founded cities and made laws and invented arts; and, generally speaking, there is no institution devised by man which the power of speech has not helped us to establish." With this statement he argues that rhetoric is a fundamental part of civic life in every society and that it has been necessary in the foundation of all aspects of society. He further argues in his piece Against the Sophists that rhetoric, although it cannot be taught to just anyone, is capable of shaping the character of man. He writes, "I do think that the study of political discourse can help more than any other thing to stimulate and form such qualities of character." Aristotle, writing several years after Isocrates, supported many of his arguments and continued to make arguments for rhetoric as a civic art.

In the words of Aristotle, in the Rhetoric, rhetoric is "... the faculty of observing in any given case the available means of persuasion". According to Aristotle, this art of persuasion could be used in public settings in three different ways. He writes in Book I, Chapter III, "A member of the assembly decides about future events, a juryman about past events: while those who merely decide on the orator's skill are observers. From this it follows that there are three divisions of oratory –  (1) political, (2) forensic, and (3) the ceremonial oratory of display". Eugene Garver, in his critique of "Aristotle's Rhetoric", confirms that Aristotle viewed rhetoric as a civic art. Garver writes, "Rhetoric articulates a civic art of rhetoric, combining the almost incompatible properties of techne and appropriateness to citizens." Each of Aristotle's divisions plays a role in civic life and can be used in a different way to affect cities.

Because rhetoric is a public art capable of shaping opinion, some of the ancients including Plato found fault in it. They claimed that while it could be used to improve civic life, it could be used equally easily to deceive or manipulate with negative effects on the city. The masses were incapable of analyzing or deciding anything on their own and would therefore be swayed by the most persuasive speeches. Thus, civic life could be controlled by the one who could deliver the best speech. Plato explores the problematic moral status of rhetoric twice: in Gorgias, a dialogue named for the famed Sophist, and in The Phaedrus, a dialogue best known for its commentary on love.

More trusting in the power of rhetoric to support a republic, the Roman orator Cicero argued that art required something more than eloquence. A good orator needed also to be a good man, a person enlightened on a variety of civic topics. He describes the proper training of the orator in his major text on rhetoric, De Oratore, modeled on Plato's dialogues.

Modern day works continue to support the claims of the ancients that rhetoric is an art capable of influencing civic life. In his work Political Style, Robert Hariman claims, "Furthermore, questions of freedom, equality, and justice often are raised and addressed through performances ranging from debates to demonstrations without loss of moral content". James Boyd White argues further that rhetoric is capable not only of addressing issues of political interest but that it can influence culture as a whole. In his book, When Words Lose Their Meaning, he argues that words of persuasion and identification define community and civic life. He states that words produce "the methods by which culture is maintained, criticized, and transformed". Both White and Hariman agree that words and rhetoric have the power to shape culture and civic life.

In modern times, rhetoric has consistently remained relevant as a civic art. In speeches, as well as in non-verbal forms, rhetoric continues to be used as a tool to influence communities from local to national levels.

As a course of study
Rhetoric as a course of study has evolved significantly since its ancient beginnings. Through the ages, the study and teaching of rhetoric has adapted to the particular exigencies of the time and venue.  The study of rhetoric has conformed to a multitude of different applications, ranging from architecture to literature.  Although the curriculum has transformed in a number of ways, it has generally emphasized the study of principles and rules of composition as a means for moving audiences. Generally speaking, the study of rhetoric trains students to speak and/or write effectively, as well as critically understand and analyze discourse.

Rhetoric began as a civic art in Ancient Greece where students were trained to develop tactics of oratorical persuasion, especially in legal disputes. Rhetoric originated in a school of pre-Socratic philosophers known as the Sophists circa 600 BC. Demosthenes and Lysias emerged as major orators during this period, and Isocrates and Gorgias as prominent teachers. Rhetorical education focused on five particular canons: inventio (invention), dispositio (arrangement), elocutio (style), memoria (memory), and actio (delivery). Modern teachings continue to reference these rhetorical leaders and their work in discussions of classical rhetoric and persuasion.

Rhetoric was later taught in universities during the Middle Ages as one of the three original liberal arts or trivium (along with logic and grammar). During the medieval period, political rhetoric declined as republican oratory died out and the emperors of Rome garnered increasing authority. With the rise of European monarchs in following centuries, rhetoric shifted into the courtly and religious applications.  Augustine exerted strong influence on Christian rhetoric in the Middle Ages, advocating the use of rhetoric to lead audiences to truth and understanding, especially in the church. The study of liberal arts, he believed, contributed to rhetorical study: "In the case of a keen and ardent nature, fine words will come more readily through reading and hearing the eloquent than by pursuing the rules of rhetoric." Poetry and letter writing, for instance, became a central component of rhetorical study during the Middle Ages. After the fall of the Republic in Rome, poetry became a tool for rhetorical training since there were fewer opportunities for political speech. Letter writing was the primary form through which business was conducted both in state and church, so it became an important aspect of rhetorical education.

Rhetorical education became more restrained as style and substance separated in 16th-century France with Peter Ramus, and attention turned to the scientific method. That is, influential scholars like Ramus argued that the processes of invention and arrangement should be elevated to the domain of philosophy, while rhetorical instruction should be chiefly concerned with the use of figures and other forms of the ornamentation of language. Scholars such as Francis Bacon developed the study of "scientific rhetoric". This concentration rejected the elaborate style characteristic of the classical oration. This plain language carried over to John Locke's teaching, which emphasized concrete knowledge and steered away from ornamentation in speech, further alienating rhetorical instruction, which was identified wholly with this ornamentation, from the pursuit of knowledge.

In the 18th century, rhetoric assumed a more social role, initiating the creation of new education systems.  "Elocution schools" arose (predominantly in England) in which females analyzed classic literature, most notably the works of William Shakespeare, and discussed pronunciation tactics.

The study of rhetoric underwent a revival with the rise of democratic institutions during the late 18th and early 19th centuries. Scotland's author and theorist Hugh Blair served as a key leader of this movement during the late 18th century. In his most famous work "Lectures on Rhetoric and Belles Lettres", he advocates rhetorical study for common citizens as a resource for social success. Many American colleges and secondary schools used Blair's text throughout the 19th century to train students of rhetoric.

Political rhetoric also underwent renewal in the wake of the US and French revolutions. The rhetorical studies of ancient Greece and Rome were resurrected in the studies of the era as speakers and teachers looked to Cicero and others to inspire defense of the new republic. Leading rhetorical theorists included John Quincy Adams of Harvard who advocated the democratic advancement of rhetorical art. Harvard's founding of the Boylston Professorship of Rhetoric and Oratory sparked the growth of rhetorical study in colleges across the United States. Harvard's rhetoric program drew inspiration from literary sources to guide organization and style. Recently, there have been studies conducted examining the rhetoric used in political speech acts to illustrate how political figures will persuade audiences for their own purposes.

Debate clubs and lyceums also developed as forums in which common citizens could hear speakers and sharpen debate skills. The American lyceum in particular was seen as both an educational and social institution, featuring group discussions and guest lecturers.  These programs cultivated democratic values and promoted active participation in political analysis.

Throughout the 20th century, rhetoric developed as a concentrated field of study with the establishment of rhetorical courses in high schools and universities. Courses such as public speaking and speech analysis apply fundamental Greek theories (such as the modes of persuasion: ethos, pathos, and logos) as well as trace rhetorical development throughout the course of history. Rhetoric has earned a more esteemed reputation as a field of study with the emergence of Communication Studies departments as well as Rhetoric and Composition programs within English departments in universities and in conjunction with the linguistic turn. Rhetorical study has broadened in scope, and is especially utilized by the fields of marketing, politics, and literature.

Another area of rhetoric is the study of cultural rhetorics, which is the communication that occurs between cultures and the study of the way members of the culture communicate with each other. These ideas can then be studied and understood by other cultures, in order to bridge gaps in modes of communication and help different cultures communicate effectively with each other. James Zappen defines cultural rhetorics as the idea that rhetoric is concerned with negotiation and listening, not persuasion, which differs from ancient definitions. Some ancient rhetoric was looked down on for fear that the persuasive techniques would be used to teach falsehoods. Communication in cultural rhetorics is focused on listening and negotiation, and has little to do with persuasion.

Rhetoric, as an area of study, is concerned with how humans use symbols, especially language, to reach agreement that permits coordinated effort of some sort. Harvard University, the first university in the United States, based on the European model, taught a basic curriculum, including rhetoric. Rhetoric, in this sense, how to properly give speeches, played an important role in their training. Rhetoric was soon taught in departments of English as well.

Music
Having enjoyed a resurgence during the Renaissance nearly every author who wrote about music before the Romantic era discussed rhetoric. Joachim Burmeister wrote in 1601, "there is only little difference between music and the nature of oration". Christoph Bernhard in the latter half of the century said "...until the art of music has attained such a height in our own day, that it may indeed be compared to a rhetoric, in view of the multitude of figures".

Knowledge
The relationship between rhetoric and knowledge is an old and interesting philosophical problem, partly because of our different assumptions on the nature of knowledge. But it is fairly clear that while knowledge is primarily concerned with what is commonly known as "truth", rhetoric is primarily concerned with statements and their effects on the audience. The word "rhetoric" may also refer to "empty speak", which reflects an indifference to truth, and in this sense rhetoric is adversarial to knowledge. Plato famously criticized the Sophists for their rhetoric which had persuaded people to sentence his friend Socrates to death regardless of what was true. However, rhetoric is also used in the construction of true arguments, or in identifying what is relevant, the crux of the matter, in a selection of true but otherwise trivial statements. Hence, rhetoric is also closely related to knowledge.

History
Rhetoric has its origins in Mesopotamia. Some of the earliest examples of rhetoric can be found in the Akkadian writings of the princess and priestess Enheduanna (c. 2285–2250 BC). As the first named author in history, Enheduanna's writing exhibits numerous rhetorical features that would later become canon in Ancient Greece. Enheduanna's "The Exaltation of Inanna," includes an exordium, argument, and peroration, as well as elements of ethos, pathos, and logos, and repetition and metonymy. She is also known for describing her process of invention in "The Exaltation of Inanna," moving between first- and third-person address to relate her composing process in collaboration with the goddess Inanna, reflecting a mystical enthymeme in drawing upon a Cosmic audience. Later examples of early rhetoric can be found in the Neo-Assyrian Empire during the time of Sennacherib (704–681 BC).

In ancient Egypt, rhetoric had existed since at least the Middle Kingdom period (c. 2080–1640 BC). The five canons of eloquence in ancient Egyptian rhetoric include silence, timing, restraint, fluency, and truthfulness. The Egyptians held eloquent speaking in high esteem, and it was a skill that had a very high value in their society. The "Egyptian rules of rhetoric" also clearly specified that "knowing when not to speak is essential, and very respected, rhetorical knowledge". Their "approach to rhetoric" was thus a "balance between eloquence and wise silence". Their rules of speech also strongly emphasized "adherence to social behaviors that support a conservative status quo" and they held that "skilled speech should support, not question, society". In ancient China, rhetoric dates back to the Chinese philosopher, Confucius (551–479 BC), and continued with later followers. The tradition of Confucianism emphasized the use of eloquence in speaking. The use of rhetoric can also be found in the ancient Biblical tradition.

In ancient Greece, the earliest mention of oratorical skill occurs in Homer's Iliad, where heroes like Achilles, Hector, and Odysseus were honored for their ability to advise and exhort their peers and followers (the Laos or army) in wise and appropriate action. With the rise of the democratic polis, speaking skill was adapted to the needs of the public and political life of cities in ancient Greece, much of which revolved around the use of oratory as the medium through which political and judicial decisions were made, and through which philosophical ideas were developed and disseminated. For modern students today, it can be difficult to remember that the wide use and availability of written texts is a phenomenon that was just coming into vogue in Classical Greece. In Classical times, many of the great thinkers and political leaders performed their works before an audience, usually in the context of a competition or contest for fame, political influence, and cultural capital; in fact, many of them are known only through the texts that their students, followers, or detractors wrote down. As has already been noted, rhetor was the Greek term for orator:  A rhetor was a citizen who regularly addressed juries and political assemblies and who was thus understood to have gained some knowledge about public speaking in the process, though in general facility with language was often referred to as logôn techne, "skill with arguments" or "verbal artistry".

Rhetoric thus evolved as an important art, one that provided the orator with the forms, means, and strategies for persuading an audience of the correctness of the orator's arguments. Today the term rhetoric can be used at times to refer only to the form of argumentation, often with the pejorative connotation that rhetoric is a means of obscuring the truth. Classical philosophers believed quite the contrary: the skilled use of rhetoric was essential to the discovery of truths, because it provided the means of ordering and clarifying arguments.

Sophists

In Europe, organized thought about public speaking began in ancient Greece. Possibly, the first study about the power of language may be attributed to the philosopher Empedocles (d. c. 444 BC), whose theories on human knowledge would provide a newfound basis for many future rhetoricians. The first written manual is attributed to Corax and his pupil Tisias. Their work, as well as that of many of the early rhetoricians, grew out of the courts of law; Tisias, for example, is believed to have written judicial speeches that others delivered in the courts.

Teaching in oratory was popularized in the 5th century BC by itinerant teachers known as sophists, the best known of whom were Protagoras (c. 481–420 BC), Gorgias (c. 483–376 BC), and Isocrates (436–338 BC). Aspasia of Miletus is believed to be one of the first women to engage in private and public rhetoric activities as a Sophist. The Sophists were a disparate group who travelled from city to city, teaching in public places to attract students and offer them an education. Their central focus was on logos or what we might broadly refer to as discourse, its functions and powers. They defined parts of speech, analyzed poetry, parsed close synonyms, invented argumentation strategies, and debated the nature of reality. They claimed to make their students "better", or, in other words, to teach virtue. They thus claimed that human "excellence" was not an accident of fate or a prerogative of noble birth, but an art or "techne" that could be taught and learned. They were thus among the first humanists.

Several sophists also questioned received wisdom about the gods and the Greek culture, which they believed was taken for granted by Greeks of their time, making them among the first agnostics. For example, they argued that cultural practices were a function of convention or nomos rather than blood or birth or phusis. They argued even further that morality or immorality of any action could not be judged outside of the cultural context within which it occurred. The well-known phrase, "Man is the measure of all things" arises from this belief. One of their most famous, and infamous, doctrines has to do with probability and counter arguments. They taught that every argument could be countered with an opposing argument, that an argument's effectiveness derived from how "likely" it appeared to the audience (its probability of seeming true), and that any probability argument could be countered with an inverted probability argument. Thus, if it seemed likely that a strong, poor man were guilty of robbing a rich, weak man, the strong poor man could argue, on the contrary, that this very likelihood (that he would be a suspect) makes it unlikely that he committed the crime, since he would most likely be apprehended for the crime. They also taught and were known for their ability to make the weaker (or worse) argument the stronger (or better).  Aristophanes famously parodies the clever inversions that sophists were known for in his play The Clouds.

The word "sophistry" developed strong negative connotations in ancient Greece that continue today, but in ancient Greece sophists were nevertheless popular and well-paid professionals, widely respected for their abilities but also widely criticized for their excesses.

Isocrates

Isocrates (436–338 BC), like the sophists, taught public speaking as a means of human improvement, but he worked to distinguish himself from the Sophists, whom he saw as claiming far more than they could deliver. He suggested that while an art of virtue or excellence did exist, it was only one piece, and the least, in a process of self-improvement that relied much more heavily on native talent and desire, constant practice, and the imitation of good models. Isocrates believed that practice in speaking publicly about noble themes and important questions would function to improve the character of both speaker and audience while also offering the best service to a city. In fact, Isocrates was an outspoken champion of rhetoric as a mode of civic engagement. He thus wrote his speeches as "models" for his students to imitate in the same way that poets might imitate Homer or Hesiod, seeking to inspire in them a desire to attain fame through civic leadership. His was the first permanent school in Athens and it is likely that Plato's Academy and Aristotle's Lyceum were founded in part as a response to Isocrates. Though he left no handbooks, his speeches ("Antidosis" and "Against the Sophists" are most relevant to students of rhetoric) became models of oratory (he was one of the canonical "Ten Attic Orators") and keys to his entire educational program. He had a marked influence on Cicero and Quintilian, and through them, on the entire educational system of the west.

Plato

Plato (427–347 BC) famously outlined the differences between true and false rhetoric in a number of dialogues; particularly the Gorgias and Phaedrus dialogues wherein Plato disputes the sophistic notion that the art of persuasion (the sophists' art, which he calls "rhetoric"), can exist independent of the art of dialectic. Plato claims that since sophists appeal only to what seems probable, they are not advancing their students and audiences, but simply flattering them with what they want to hear. While Plato's condemnation of rhetoric is clear in the Gorgias, in the Phaedrus he suggests the possibility of a true art wherein rhetoric is based upon the knowledge produced by dialectic, and relies on a dialectically informed rhetoric to appeal to the main character, Phaedrus, to take up philosophy. Thus Plato's rhetoric is actually dialectic (or philosophy) "turned" toward those who are not yet philosophers and are thus unready to pursue dialectic directly. Plato's animosity against rhetoric, and against the sophists, derives not only from their inflated claims to teach virtue and their reliance on appearances, but from the fact that his teacher, Socrates, was sentenced to death after sophists' efforts.

Some scholars, however, see Plato not as an opponent of rhetoric but rather as a nuanced rhetorical theorist who dramatized rhetorical practice in his dialogues and imagined rhetoric as more than just oratory.

Aristotle 

Aristotle (384–322 BC) was a student of Plato who famously set forth an extended treatise on rhetoric that still repays careful study today. In the first sentence of The Art of Rhetoric, Aristotle says that "rhetoric is the counterpart [literally, the antistrophe] of dialectic". As the "antistrophe" of a Greek ode responds to and is patterned after the structure of the "strophe" (they form two sections of the whole and are sung by two parts of the chorus), so the art of rhetoric follows and is structurally patterned after the art of dialectic because both are arts of discourse production. Thus, while dialectical methods are necessary to find truth in theoretical matters, rhetorical methods are required in practical matters such as adjudicating somebody's guilt or innocence when charged in a court of law, or adjudicating a prudent course of action to be taken in a deliberative assembly. The core features of dialectic include the absence of determined subject matter, its elaboration on earlier empirical practice, the explication of its aims, the type of utility and the definition of the proper function.

For Plato and Aristotle, dialectic involves persuasion, so when Aristotle says that rhetoric is the antistrophe of dialectic, he means that rhetoric as he uses the term has a domain or scope of application that is parallel to, but different from, the domain or scope of application of dialectic. In Nietzsche Humanist (1998: 129), Claude Pavur explains that "[t]he Greek prefix 'anti' does not merely designate opposition, but it can also mean 'in place of.'"  When Aristotle characterizes rhetoric as the antistrophe of dialectic, he no doubt means that rhetoric is used in place of dialectic when we are discussing civic issues in a court of law or in a legislative assembly. The domain of rhetoric is civic affairs and practical decision making in civic affairs, not theoretical considerations of operational definitions of terms and clarification of thought. These, for him, are in the domain of dialectic.

Aristotle's treatise on rhetoric systematically describes civic rhetoric as a human art or skill (techne). It is more of an objective theory than it is an interpretive theory with a rhetorical tradition. Aristotle's art of rhetoric emphasizes persuasion as the purpose of rhetoric. His definition of rhetoric as "the faculty of observing in any given case the available means of persuasion", essentially a mode of discovery, limits the art to the inventional process, and Aristotle heavily emphasizes the logical aspect of this process. In his account, rhetoric is the art of discovering all available means of persuasion. A speaker supports the probability of a message by logical, ethical, and emotional proofs. Some form of logos, ethos, and pathos is present in every possible public presentation that exists. But the treatise in fact also discusses not only elements of style and (briefly) delivery, but also emotional appeals (pathos) and characterological appeals (ethos).

Aristotle identifies three steps or "offices" of rhetoric—invention, arrangement, and style—and three different types of rhetorical proof: ethos (Aristotle's theory of character and how the character and credibility of a speaker can influence an audience to consider him/her to be believable—there being three qualities that contribute to a credible ethos: perceived intelligence, virtuous character, and goodwill); pathos (the use of emotional appeals to alter the audience's judgment through metaphor, amplification, storytelling, or presenting the topic in a way that evokes strong emotions in the audience.); and, logos (the use of reasoning, either inductive or deductive, to construct an argument).

Aristotle emphasized enthymematic reasoning as central to the process of rhetorical invention, though later rhetorical theorists placed much less emphasis on it. An "enthymeme" would follow today's form of a syllogism; however it would exclude either the major or minor premise. An enthymeme is persuasive because the audience is providing the missing premise. Because the audience is able to provide the missing premise, they are more likely to be persuaded by the message.

Aristotle identified three different types or genres of civic rhetoric.  Forensic (also known as judicial), was concerned with determining the truth or falseness of events that took place in the past and issues of guilt. An example of forensic rhetoric would be in a courtroom.  Deliberative (also known as political), was concerned with determining whether or not particular actions should or should not be taken in the future. Making laws would be an example of deliberative rhetoric.  Epideictic (also known as ceremonial), was concerned with praise and blame, values, right and wrong, demonstrating beauty and skill in the present. Examples of epideictic rhetoric would include a eulogy or a wedding toast.

Indian rhetoric

India has a deep and enriching past in the art of rhetoric. In India's Struggle for Independence, Chandra et al. offer a vivid description of the culture that sprang up around the newspaper in village India of the early 1870s:

This reading and discussion was the focal point of origin of the modern Indian rhetorical movement. Much before this, ancient greats such as Kautilya, Birbal, and the likes indulged themselves in a great deal of discussion and persuasion.

Keith Lloyd in his 2007 article "Rethinking Rhetoric from an Indian perspective: Implications in the Nyaya Sutra" said that much of the recital of the Vedas can be likened to the recital of ancient Greek poetry. Lloyd proposed including the Nyāya Sūtras in the field of rhetorical studies, exploring its methods within their historical context, comparing its approach to the traditional logical syllogism, and relating it to the contemporary perspectives of Stephen Toulmin, Kenneth Burke, and Chaim Perelman.

Nyaya is a Sanskrit word which means just or right and refers to "the science of right and wrong reasoning" (Radhakrishnan & Moore, 1957, p. 356). Sutra is also a Sanskrit word which means string or thread. Here sutra refers to a collection of aphorism in the form of a manual. Each sutra is a short rule usually consisted of one or two sentences. An example of a sutra is: "Reality is truth, and what is true is so, irrespective of whether we know it is, or are aware of that truth." The Nyāya Sūtras is an ancient Indian Sanskrit text composed by Aksapada Gautama. It is the foundational text of the Nyaya school of Hindu philosophy. The date when the text was composed, and the biography of its author is unknown. It is estimated that the text was composed between 6th-century BC and 2nd-century AD. Zimmer (2013) has said that the text may have been composed by more one author, over a period of time. Radhakrishan and Moore (1957) placed its origin in the "third century BC ... though some of the contents of the Nyaya Sutra are certainly a post-Christian era" (p. 36). Vidyabhusana (1930) stated that the ancient school of Nyaya extended over a period of one thousand years, beginning with Gautama about 550 BC and ending with Vatsyayana about 400 AD.

Nyaya provides significant insight into the Indian rhetoric. Nyaya presents an argumentative approach that works a rhetor how to decide about any argument. In addition, it proposes a new approach of thinking of a cultural tradition which is different from the Western rhetoric. It also broadens the view of rhetoric and the relationship among human beings. Nyaya proposes an enlightenment of reality which is associated with situations, time, and places. Toulmin emphasizes the situational dimension of argumentative genre as the fundamental component of any rhetorical logic. On the contrary, Nyaya views this situational rhetoric in a new way which offers context of practical arguments.

Some of India's famous rhetors include Kabir Das, Rahim Das, Chanakya, Chandragupt Maurya, and so on.

Canons
The  serve as a guide to creating persuasive messages and arguments. These are invention (the process of developing arguments); arrangement (organizing the arguments for extreme effect); style (determining how to present the arguments); memory (the process of learning and memorizing the speech and persuasive messages), and delivery (the gestures, pronunciation, tone and pace used when presenting the persuasive arguments).

In the rhetoric field, there is an intellectual debate about Aristotle's definition of rhetoric. Some believe that Aristotle defines rhetoric in On Rhetoric as the art of persuasion, while others think he defines it as the art of judgment. Rhetoric as the art of judgment would mean the rhetor discerns the available means of persuasion with a choice. Aristotle also says rhetoric is concerned with judgment because the audience judges the rhetor's ethos.

One of the most famous of Aristotelian doctrines was the idea of topics (also referred to as common topics or commonplaces). Though the term had a wide range of application (as a memory technique or compositional exercise, for example) it most often referred to the "seats of argument"—the list of categories of thought or modes of reasoning—that a speaker could use to generate arguments or proofs. The topics were thus a heuristic or inventional tool designed to help speakers categorize and thus better retain and apply frequently used types of argument. For example, since we often see effects as "like" their causes, one way to invent an argument (about a future effect) is by discussing the cause (which it will be "like"). This and other rhetorical topics derive from Aristotle's belief that there are certain predictable ways in which humans (particularly non-specialists) draw conclusions from premises. Based upon and adapted from his dialectical Topics, the rhetorical topics became a central feature of later rhetorical theorizing, most famously in Cicero's work of that name.

Cicero

For the Romans, oration became an important part of public life. Cicero (106–43 BC) was chief among Roman rhetoricians and remains the best known ancient orator and the only orator who both spoke in public and produced treatises on the subject. Rhetorica ad Herennium, formerly attributed to Cicero but now considered to be of unknown authorship, is one of the most significant works on rhetoric and is still widely used as a reference today. It is an extensive reference on the use of rhetoric, and in the Middle Ages and Renaissance, it achieved wide publication as an advanced school text on rhetoric.

Cicero is considered one of the most significant rhetoricians of all time, charting a middle path between the competing Attic and Asiatic styles to become considered second only to Demosthenes among history's orators. His works include the early and very influential De Inventione (On Invention, often read alongside the Ad Herennium as the two basic texts of rhetorical theory throughout the Middle Ages and into the Renaissance), De Oratore (a fuller statement of rhetorical principles in dialogue form), Topics (a rhetorical treatment of common topics, highly influential through the Renaissance), Brutus (a discussion of famous orators) and Orator (a defense of Cicero's style). Cicero also left a large body of speeches and letters which would establish the outlines of Latin eloquence and style for generations to come.

It was the rediscovery of Cicero's speeches (such as the defense of Archias) and letters (to Atticus) by Italians like Petrarch that, in part, ignited the cultural innovations that is known as the Renaissance. He championed the learning of Greek (and Greek rhetoric), contributed to Roman ethics, linguistics, philosophy, and politics, and emphasized the importance of all forms of appeal (emotion, humor, stylistic range, irony and digression in addition to pure reasoning) in oratory. But perhaps his most significant contribution to subsequent rhetoric, and education in general, was his argument that orators learn not only about the specifics of their case (the hypothesis) but also about the general questions from which they derived (the theses). Thus, in giving a speech in defense of a poet whose Roman citizenship had been questioned, the orator should examine not only the specifics of that poet's civic status, he should also examine the role and value of poetry and of literature more generally in Roman culture and political life. The orator, said Cicero, needed to be knowledgeable about all areas of human life and culture, including law, politics, history, literature, ethics, warfare, medicine, even arithmetic and geometry. Cicero gave rise to the idea that the "ideal orator" be well-versed in all branches of learning: an idea that was rendered as "liberal humanism", and that lives on today in liberal arts or general education requirements in colleges and universities around the world.

Quintilian

Quintilian (35–100 AD) began his career as a pleader in the courts of law; his reputation grew so great that Vespasian created a chair of rhetoric for him in Rome. The culmination of his life's work was the Institutio Oratoria (Institutes of Oratory, or alternatively, The Orator's Education), a lengthy treatise on the training of the orator, in which he discusses the training of the "perfect" orator from birth to old age and, in the process, reviews the doctrines and opinions of many influential rhetoricians who preceded him.

In the Institutes, Quintilian organizes rhetorical study through the stages of education that an aspiring orator would undergo, beginning with the selection of a nurse. Aspects of elementary education (training in reading and writing, grammar, and literary criticism) are followed by preliminary rhetorical exercises in composition (the progymnasmata) that include maxims and fables, narratives and comparisons, and finally full legal or political speeches. The delivery of speeches within the context of education or for entertainment purposes became widespread and popular under the term "declamation". Rhetorical training proper was categorized under five canons that would persist for centuries in academic circles:
 Inventio (invention) is the process that leads to the development and refinement of an argument.
 Once arguments are developed, dispositio (disposition, or arrangement) is used to determine how it should be organized for greatest effect, usually beginning with the exordium.
 Once the speech content is known and the structure is determined, the next steps involve elocutio (style) and pronuntiatio (presentation).
 Memoria (memory) comes to play as the speaker recalls each of these elements during the speech.
 Actio (delivery) is the final step as the speech is presented in a gracious and pleasing way to the audience – the Grand Style.

This work was available only in fragments in medieval times, but the discovery of a complete copy at the Abbey of St. Gall in 1416 led to its emergence as one of the most influential works on rhetoric during the Renaissance.

Quintilian's work describes not just the art of rhetoric, but the formation of the perfect orator as a politically active, virtuous, publicly minded citizen. His emphasis was on the ethical application of rhetorical training, in part a reaction against the growing tendency in Roman schools toward standardization of themes and techniques. At the same time that rhetoric was becoming divorced from political decision making, rhetoric rose as a culturally vibrant and important mode of entertainment and cultural criticism in a movement known as the "second sophistic", a development that gave rise to the charge (made by Quintilian and others) that teachers were emphasizing style over substance in rhetoric.

Medieval to Enlightenment
After the breakup of the western Roman Empire, the study of rhetoric continued to be central to the study of the verbal arts; but the study of the verbal arts went into decline for several centuries, followed eventually by a gradual rise in formal education, culminating in the rise of medieval universities. But rhetoric transmuted during this period into the arts of letter writing (ars dictaminis) and sermon writing (ars praedicandi). As part of the trivium, rhetoric was secondary to the study of logic, and its study was highly scholastic: students were given repetitive exercises in the creation of discourses on historical subjects (suasoriae) or on classic legal questions (controversiae).

Although he is not commonly regarded as a rhetorician, St. Augustine (354–430) was trained in rhetoric and was at one time a professor of Latin rhetoric in Milan. After his conversion to Christianity, he became interested in using these "pagan" arts for spreading his religion. This new use of rhetoric is explored in the Fourth Book of his De Doctrina Christiana, which laid the foundation of what would become homiletics, the rhetoric of the sermon. Augustine begins the book by asking why "the power of eloquence, which is so efficacious in pleading either for the erroneous cause or the right", should not be used for righteous purposes (IV. 3).

One early concern of the medieval Christian church was its attitude to classical rhetoric itself. Jerome (d. 420) complained, "What has Horace to do with the Psalms, Virgil with the Gospels, Cicero with the Apostles?" Augustine is also remembered for arguing for the preservation of pagan works and fostering a church tradition that led to conservation of numerous pre-Christian rhetorical writings.

Rhetoric would not regain its classical heights until the Renaissance, but new writings did advance rhetorical thought. Boethius (480?–524), in his brief Overview of the Structure of Rhetoric, continues Aristotle's taxonomy by placing rhetoric in subordination to philosophical argument or dialectic. The introduction of Arab scholarship from European relations with the Muslim empire (in particular Al-Andalus) renewed interest in Aristotle and Classical thought in general, leading to what some historians call the 12th century Renaissance. A number of medieval grammars and studies of poetry and rhetoric appeared.

Late medieval rhetorical writings include those of St. Thomas Aquinas (1225?–1274), Matthew of Vendome (Ars Versificatoria, 1175?), and Geoffrey of Vinsauf (Poetria Nova, 1200–1216). Pre-modern female rhetoricians, outside of Socrates' friend Aspasia, are rare; but medieval rhetoric produced by women either in religious orders, such as Julian of Norwich (d. 1415), or the very well-connected Christine de Pizan (1364?–1430?), did occur if not always recorded in writing.

In his 1943 Cambridge University doctoral dissertation in English, Canadian Marshall McLuhan (1911–1980) surveys the verbal arts from approximately the time of Cicero down to the time of Thomas Nashe (1567–1600?).  His dissertation is still noteworthy for undertaking to study the history of the verbal arts together as the trivium, even though the developments that he surveys have been studied in greater detail since he undertook his study. As noted below, McLuhan became one of the most widely publicized thinkers in the 20th century, so it is important to note his scholarly roots in the study of the history of rhetoric and dialectic.

Another interesting record of medieval rhetorical thought can be seen in the many animal debate poems popular in England and the continent during the Middle Ages, such as The Owl and the Nightingale (13th century) and Geoffrey Chaucer's Parliament of Fowls.

Sixteenth century
Walter J. Ong's article "Humanism" in the 1967 New Catholic Encyclopedia surveys Renaissance humanism, which defined itself broadly as disfavoring medieval scholastic logic and dialectic and as favoring instead the study of classical Latin style and grammar and philology and rhetoric. (Reprinted in Ong's Faith and Contexts (Scholars Press, 1999; 4: 69–91.))

One influential figure in the rebirth of interest in classical rhetoric was Erasmus (–1536). His 1512 work, De Duplici Copia Verborum et Rerum (also known as Copia: Foundations of the Abundant Style), was widely published (it went through more than 150 editions throughout Europe) and became one of the basic school texts on the subject. Its treatment of rhetoric is less comprehensive than the classic works of antiquity, but provides a traditional treatment of res-verba (matter and form): its first book treats the subject of elocutio, showing the student how to use schemes and tropes; the second book covers inventio. Much of the emphasis is on abundance of variation (copia means "plenty" or "abundance", as in copious or cornucopia), so both books focus on ways to introduce the maximum amount of variety into discourse. For instance, in one section of the De Copia, Erasmus presents two hundred variations of the sentence "" Another of his works, the extremely popular The Praise of Folly, also had considerable influence on the teaching of rhetoric in the later 16th century. Its orations in favour of qualities such as madness spawned a type of exercise popular in Elizabethan grammar schools, later called adoxography, which required pupils to compose passages in praise of useless things.

Juan Luis Vives (1492–1540) also helped shape the study of rhetoric in England. A Spaniard, he was appointed in 1523 to the Lectureship of Rhetoric at Oxford by Cardinal Wolsey, and was entrusted by Henry VIII to be one of the tutors of Mary. Vives fell into disfavor when Henry VIII divorced Catherine of Aragon and left England in 1528. His best-known work was a book on education, published in 1531, and his writings on rhetoric included  (1533),  (1533), and a rhetoric on letter writing,  (1536).

It is likely that many well-known English writers were exposed to the works of Erasmus and Vives (as well as those of the Classical rhetoricians) in their schooling, which was conducted in Latin (not English) and often included some study of Greek and placed considerable emphasis on rhetoric. See, for example, T.W. Baldwin's , 2 vols. (University of Illinois Press, 1944).

The mid-16th century saw the rise of vernacular rhetorics—those written in English rather than in the Classical languages; adoption of works in English was slow, however, due to the strong orientation toward Latin and Greek. Leonard Cox's The Art or Crafte of Rhetoryke (c. 1524–1530; second edition published in 1532) is considered to be the earliest text on rhetorics in English; it was, for the most part, a translation of the work of Philipp Melanchthon. A successful early text was Thomas Wilson's  (1553), which presents a traditional treatment of rhetoric. For instance, Wilson presents the five canons of rhetoric (Invention, Disposition, Elocutio, Memoria, and Utterance or Actio). Other notable works included Angel Day's  (1586, 1592), George Puttenham's  (1589), and Richard Rainholde's  (1563).

During this same period, a movement began that would change the organization of the school curriculum in Protestant and especially Puritan circles and led to rhetoric losing its central place. A French scholar, Pierre de la Ramée, in Latin Petrus Ramus (1515–1572), dissatisfied with what he saw as the overly broad and redundant organization of the trivium, proposed a new curriculum. In his scheme of things, the five components of rhetoric no longer lived under the common heading of rhetoric. Instead, invention and disposition were determined to fall exclusively under the heading of dialectic, while style, delivery, and memory were all that remained for rhetoric. See Walter J. Ong, Ramus, Method, and the Decay of Dialogue: From the Art of Discourse to the Art of Reason (Harvard University Press, 1958; reissued by the University of Chicago Press, 2004, with a new foreword by Adrian Johns). Ramus was martyred during the French Wars of Religion. His teachings, seen as inimical to Catholicism, were short-lived in France but found a fertile ground in the Netherlands, Germany and England.

One of Ramus' French followers, Audomarus Talaeus (Omer Talon) published his rhetoric, Institutiones Oratoriae, in 1544. This work provided a simple presentation of rhetoric that emphasized the treatment of style, and became so popular that it was mentioned in John Brinsley's (1612) Ludus literarius;  as being the "". Many other Ramist rhetorics followed in the next half-century, and by the 17th century, their approach became the primary method of teaching rhetoric in Protestant and especially Puritan circles. John Milton (1608–1674) wrote a textbook in logic or dialectic in Latin based on Ramus' work.

Ramism could not exert any influence on the established Catholic schools and universities, which remained loyal to Scholasticism, or on the new Catholic schools and universities founded by members of the religious orders known as the Society of Jesus or the Oratorians, as can be seen in the Jesuit curriculum (in use right up to the 19th century, across the Christian world) known as the Ratio Studiorum (that Claude Pavur, S.J., has recently translated into English, with the Latin text in the parallel column on each page (St. Louis: Institute of Jesuit Sources, 2005)). If the influence of Cicero and Quintilian permeates the Ratio Studiorum, it is through the lenses of devotion and the militancy of the Counter-Reformation. The Ratio was indeed imbued with a sense of the divine, of the incarnate logos, that is of rhetoric as an eloquent and humane means to reach further devotion and further action in the Christian city, which was absent from Ramist formalism. The Ratio is, in rhetoric, the answer to St Ignatius Loyola's practice, in devotion, of "spiritual exercises". This complex oratorical-prayer system is absent from Ramism.

Seventeenth century
In New England and at Harvard College (founded 1636), Ramus and his followers dominated, as Perry Miller shows in The New England Mind: The Seventeenth Century (Harvard University Press, 1939). However, in England, several writers influenced the course of rhetoric during the 17th century, many of them carrying forward the dichotomy that had been set forth by Ramus and his followers during the preceding decades. Of greater importance is that this century saw the development of a modern, vernacular style that looked to English, rather than to Greek, Latin, or French models.

Francis Bacon (1561–1626), although not a rhetorician, contributed to the field in his writings. One of the concerns of the age was to find a suitable style for the discussion of scientific topics, which needed above all a clear exposition of facts and arguments, rather than the ornate style favored at the time. Bacon in his The Advancement of Learning criticized those who are preoccupied with style rather than "the weight of matter, worth of subject, soundness of argument, life of invention, or depth of judgment". On matters of style, he proposed that the style conform to the subject matter and to the audience, that simple words be employed whenever possible, and that the style should be agreeable.

Thomas Hobbes (1588–1679) also wrote on rhetoric. Along with a shortened translation of Aristotle's Rhetoric, Hobbes also produced a number of other works on the subject. Sharply contrarian on many subjects, Hobbes, like Bacon, also promoted a simpler and more natural style that used figures of speech sparingly.

Perhaps the most influential development in English style came out of the work of the Royal Society (founded in 1660), which in 1664 set up a committee to improve the English language. Among the committee's members were John Evelyn (1620–1706), Thomas Sprat (1635–1713), and John Dryden (1631–1700). Sprat regarded "fine speaking" as a disease, and thought that a proper style should "reject all amplifications, digressions, and swellings of style" and instead "return back to a primitive purity and shortness" (History of the Royal Society, 1667).

While the work of this committee never went beyond planning, John Dryden is often credited with creating and exemplifying a new and modern English style. His central tenet was that the style should be proper "to the occasion, the subject, and the persons". As such, he advocated the use of English words whenever possible instead of foreign ones, as well as vernacular, rather than Latinate, syntax. His own prose (and his poetry) became exemplars of this new style.

Eighteenth century
Arguably one of the most influential schools of rhetoric during this time was Scottish Belletristic rhetoric, exemplified by such professors of rhetoric as Hugh Blair whose Lectures on Rhetoric and Belles Lettres saw international success in various editions and translations.

Another notable figure in 18th century rhetoric was Maria Edgeworth, a novelist and children's author whose work often parodied the male-centric rhetorical strategies of her time. In her 1795 "An Essay on the Noble Science of Self-Justification," Edgeworth presents a satire of Enlightenment rhetoric's science-centrism and the Belletristic Movement. She was called "the great Maria" by Sir Walter Scott, with whom she corresponded, and by contemporary scholars is noted as "a transgressive and ironic reader" of the 18th century rhetorical norms.

Nineteenth century
William G. Allen became the first American college professor of rhetoric, at New-York Central College, 1850–1853.

Modern 
At the turn of the 20th century, there was a revival of rhetorical study manifested in the establishment of departments of rhetoric and speech at academic institutions, as well as the formation of national and international professional organizations.  Jim A. Kuypers and Andrew King suggest that the early interest in rhetorical studies was a movement away from elocution as taught in departments of English in the United States, and was an attempt to refocus rhetorical studies away from delivery only to civic engagement. Collectively, they write, twentieth century rhetorical studies offered an understanding of rhetoric that demonstrated a "rich complexity" of how rhetorical scholars understood the nature of rhetoric. Theorists generally agree that by the 1930s a significant reason for the revival of the study of rhetoric was the renewed importance of language and persuasion in the increasingly mediated environment of the 20th century (see Linguistic turn) and through the 21st century, with the media focus on the wide variations and analyses of political rhetoric and its consequences. The term rhetoric has been applied to media forms other than verbal language, e.g. Visual rhetoric. Scholars have also recently highlighted the importance of "temporal rhetorics" and the "temporal turn" to rhetorical theory and practice.

The rise of advertising and of mass media such as photography, telegraphy, radio, and film brought rhetoric more prominently into people's lives. For example, rhetoric has been used to study how advertising persuades. More recently, academics use rhetoric to help understand the spread of fake news and conspiracy theories on social media.

Notable theorists 
 Chaïm Perelman was a philosopher of law, who studied, taught, and lived most of his life in Brussels. He was among the most important argumentation theorists of the 20th century. His chief work is the Traité de l'argumentation – la nouvelle rhétorique (1958), with Lucie Olbrechts-Tyteca, which was translated into English as The New Rhetoric: A Treatise on Argumentation, by John Wilkinson and Purcell Weaver (1969). Perelman and Olbrechts-Tyteca move rhetoric from the periphery to the center of argumentation theory. Among their most influential concepts are "dissociation", "the universal audience", "quasi-logical argument", and "presence".
 Kenneth Burke was a rhetorical theorist, philosopher, and poet. Many of his works are central to modern rhetorical theory: A Rhetoric of Motives (1950), A Grammar of Motives (1945), Language as Symbolic Action (1966), and Counterstatement (1931). Among his influential concepts are "identification", "consubstantiality", and the "dramatistic pentad". He described rhetoric as "the use of language as a symbolic means of inducing cooperation in beings that by nature respond to symbols". In relation to Aristotle's theory, Aristotle was more interested in constructing rhetoric, while Burke was interested in "debunking" it.
 Edwin Black was a rhetorical critic best known for his book Rhetorical Criticism: A Study in Method (1965) in which he criticized the dominant "neo-Aristotelian" tradition in American rhetorical criticism as having little in common with Aristotle "besides some recurrent topics of discussion and a vaguely derivative view of rhetorical discourse". Furthermore, he contended, because rhetorical scholars had been focusing primarily on Aristotelian logical forms they often overlooked important, alternative types of discourse. He also published several highly influential essays including: "Secrecy and Disclosure as Rhetorical Forms", "The Second Persona", and "A Note on Theory and Practice in Rhetorical Criticism".
 Marshall McLuhan was a media theorist whose theories and whose choice of objects of study are important to the study of rhetoric. McLuhan's famous dictum "the medium is the message" highlights the significance of the medium itself. No other scholar of the history and theory of rhetoric was as widely publicized in the 20th century as McLuhan.
 I. A. Richards was a literary critic and rhetorician. His The Philosophy of Rhetoric is an important text in modern rhetorical theory. In this work, he defined rhetoric as "a study of misunderstandings and its remedies", and introduced the influential concepts tenor and vehicle to describe the components of a metaphor—the main idea and the concept to which it is compared.
 The Groupe µ: This interdisciplinary team has contributed to the renovation of the elocutio in the context of poetics and modern linguistics, significantly with Rhétorique générale (1970; translated into English as A General Rhetoric, by Paul B. Burrell et Edgar M. Slotkin, Johns Hopkins University Press, 1981) and Rhétorique de la poésie (1977).
 Stephen Toulmin was a philosopher whose models of argumentation have had great influence on modern rhetorical theory. His Uses of Argument is an important text in modern rhetorical theory and argumentation theory.
 Richard Vatz is a rhetorician responsible for the salience-agenda/meaning-spin conceptualization of rhetoric, later revised (2014) to an "agenda-spin" model, a conceptualization which emphasizes persuader responsibility for the agenda and spin he/she creates. His theory is notable for its agent-focused perspective, articulated in The Only Authentic Book of Persuasion (Kendall Hunt), derived from the Summer, 1973 Philosophy and Rhetoric article, "The Myth of the Rhetorical Situation".
 Richard M. Weaver was a rhetorical and cultural critic well known for his contributions to the new conservatism. He focused on the ethical implications of rhetoric and his ideas can be seen in "Language is Sermonic" and "The Ethics of Rhetoric". According to Weaver there are four types of argument, and through the argument a person habitually uses the critic can see the rhetorician's worldview. Those who prefer the argument from genus or definition are idealists. Those who argue from similitude, such as poets and religious people, see the connectedness between things. The argument from consequence sees a cause and effect relationship. Finally the argument from circumstance considers the particulars of a situation and is an argument preferred by liberals.
 Gloria Anzaldúa was a "Mestiza" and "Borderland" rhetorician, as well as a Mexican-American poet and pioneer in the field of Chicana lesbian feminism. Mestiza and Borderland rhetoric focused on ones' formation of identity, disregarding societal and discourse labels. With "Mestiza" rhetoric, one viewed the world as discovering one's "self" in others and others' "self" in you. Through this process, one accepted living in a world of contradictions and ambiguity. Anzaldua learned to balance cultures, being Mexican in the eyes of the Anglo-majority and Indian in a Mexican culture. Her other notable works include: Sinister Wisdom, Borderlands/La Fronters: The New Mestiza, and La Prieta.
 Gertrude Buck was one of the prominent female rhetorical theorists who was also a composition educator. Her scholastic contributions such as "The present status of Rhetorical Theory" to inspire the egalitarian status of hearers-speakers to achieve the goal of communication. Another piece that she edited with Newton Scott is "Brief English Grammar" which troubled the common prescriptive grammar. This book received a lot of praise and critiques for descriptive nature of social responsibility from non-mainstream beliefs.
 Krista Ratcliffe is a prominent feminist and critical race rhetorical theorist. In her book, Rhetorical Listening: Identification, Gender, Whiteness, Ratcliffe puts forward a theory and model of rhetorical listening as "a trope for interpretive invention and more particularly as a code of cross-cultural conduct." This book has been described as "taking the field of feminist rhetoric to a new place" in its movement away from argumentative rhetoric and towards an undivided logos wherein speaking and listening are reintegrated. Reviewers have also acknowledged the theoretical contributions Ratcliffe makes towards a model for appreciating and acknowledging difference in instances of cross-cultural communication.
Sonja K. Foss is a rhetorical scholar and educator in the discipline of communication. Her research and teaching interests are in contemporary rhetorical theory and criticism, feminist perspectives on communication, the incorporation of marginalized voices into rhetorical theory and practice, and visual rhetoric.

Methods of analysis

Criticism seen as a method
Rhetoric can be analyzed by a variety of methods and theories. One such method is criticism. When those using criticism analyze instances of rhetoric what they do is called rhetorical criticism (see section below). According to rhetorical critic Jim A. Kuypers, "The use of rhetoric is an art; as such, it does not lend itself well to scientific methods of analysis. Criticism is an art as well; as such, it is particularly well suited for examining rhetorical creations." He asserts that criticism is a method of generating knowledge just as the scientific method is a method for generating knowledge: 

Edwin Black (rhetorician) wrote on this point that, "Methods, then, admit of varying degrees of personality. And criticism, on the whole, is near the indeterminate, contingent, personal end of the methodological scale. In consequence of this placement, it is neither possible nor desirable for criticism to be fixed into a system, for critical techniques to be objectified, for critics to be interchangeable for purposes of [scientific] replication, or for rhetorical criticism to serve as the handmaiden of quasi-scientific theory.  [The] idea is that critical method is too personally expressive to be systematized.

Jim A. Kuypers sums this idea of criticism as art in the following manner: "In short, criticism is an art, not a science. It is not a scientific method; it uses subjective methods of argument; it exists on its own, not in conjunction with other methods of generating knowledge (i.e., social scientific or scientific).  [I]nsight and imagination top statistical applications when studying rhetorical action."

Observation on analytic method
There does not exist an analytic method that is widely recognized as "the" rhetorical method, partly because many in rhetorical study see rhetoric as merely produced by reality (see dissent from that view below).   It is important to note that the object of rhetorical analysis is typically discourse, and therefore the principles of "rhetorical analysis" would be difficult to distinguish from those of "discourse analysis". However, rhetorical analytic methods can also be applied to almost anything, including objects—a car, a castle, a computer, a comportment.

Generally speaking, rhetorical analysis makes use of rhetorical concepts (ethos, logos, kairos, mediation, etc.) to describe the social or epistemological functions of the object of study. When the object of study happens to be some type of discourse (a speech, a poem, a joke, a newspaper article), the aim of rhetorical analysis is not simply to describe the claims and arguments advanced within the discourse, but (more important) to identify the specific semiotic strategies employed by the speaker to accomplish specific persuasive goals. Therefore, after a rhetorical analyst discovers a use of language that is particularly important in achieving persuasion, she typically moves onto the question of "How does it work?"  That is, what effects does this particular use of rhetoric have on an audience, and how does that effect provide more clues as to the speaker's (or writer's) objectives?

There are some scholars who do partial rhetorical analysis and defer judgments about rhetorical success. In other words, some analysts attempt to avoid the question of "Was this use of rhetoric successful [in accomplishing the aims of the speaker]?"  To others, however, that is the preeminent point: is the rhetoric strategically effective and what did the rhetoric accomplish?  This question allows a shift in focus from the speaker's objectives to the effects and functions of the rhetoric itself.

Strategies 
Rhetorical strategies are the efforts made by authors to persuade or inform their readers. Rhetorical strategies are employed by writers and refer to the different ways they can persuade the reader. According to Gray, there are various argument strategies used in writing. He describes four of these as argument from analogy, argument from absurdity, thought experiments, and inference to the best explanation.

Criticism
Modern rhetorical criticism explores the relationship between text and context; that is, how an instance of rhetoric relates to circumstances. Since the aim of rhetoric is to be persuasive, the level to which the rhetoric in question persuades its audience is what must be analyzed, and later criticized. In determining the extent to which a text is persuasive, one may explore the text's relationship with its audience, purpose, ethics, argument, evidence, arrangement, delivery, and style. In his Rhetorical Criticism: A Study in Method, scholar Edwin Black states, "It is the task of criticism not to measure ... discourses dogmatically against some parochial standard of rationality but, allowing for the immeasurable wide range of human experience, to see them as they really are."  While the language "as they really are" is debatable, rhetorical critics explain texts and speeches by investigating their rhetorical situation, typically placing them in a framework of speaker/audience exchange. The antithetical view places the rhetor at the center of creating that which is considered the extant situation; i.e., the agenda and spin.

Additional theoretical approaches
Following the neo-Aristotelian approaches to criticism, scholars began to derive methods from other disciplines, such as history, philosophy, and the social sciences. The importance of critics' personal judgment decreased in explicit coverage while the analytical dimension of criticism began to gain momentum. Throughout the 1960s and 1970s, methodological pluralism replaced the singular neo-Aristotelian method. Methodological rhetorical criticism is typically done by deduction, where a broad method is used to examine a specific case of rhetoric.  These types include:
 Ideological criticism – critics engage rhetoric as it suggests the beliefs, values, assumptions, and interpretations held by the rhetor or the larger culture. Ideological criticism also treats ideology as an artifact of discourse, one that is embedded in key terms (called "ideographs") as well as material resources and discursive embodiment.
 Cluster criticism – a method developed by Kenneth Burke that seeks to help the critic understand the rhetor's worldview. This means identifying terms that are 'clustered' around key symbols in the rhetorical artifact and the patterns in which they appear.
 Frame analysis – when used as rhetorical criticism, this theoretical perspective allows critics to look for how rhetors construct an interpretive lens in their discourse. In short, how they make certain facts more noticeable than others. It is particularly useful for analyzing products of the news media.
 Genre criticism – a method that assumes certain situations call for similar needs and expectations within the audience, therefore calling for certain types of rhetoric. It studies rhetoric in different times and locations, looking at similarities in the rhetorical situation and the rhetoric that responds to them. Examples include eulogies, inaugural addresses, and declarations of war.
 Narrative criticism – narratives help organize experiences in order to endow meaning to historical events and transformations. Narrative criticism focuses on the story itself and how the construction of the narrative directs the interpretation of the situation.

By the mid-1980s, however, the study of rhetorical criticism began to move away from precise methodology towards conceptual issues. Conceptually driven criticism  operates more through abduction, according to scholar James Jasinski, who argues that this emerging type of criticism can be thought of as a back-and-forth between the text and the concepts, which are being explored at the same time. The concepts remain "works in progress", and understanding those terms develops through the analysis of a text.

Criticism is considered rhetorical when it focuses on the way some types of discourse react to situational exigencies—problems or demands—and constraints. This means that modern rhetorical criticism is based in how the rhetorical case or object persuades, defines, or constructs the audience. In modern terms, what can be considered rhetoric includes, but it is not limited to, speeches, scientific discourse, pamphlets, literary work, works of art, and pictures. Contemporary rhetorical criticism has maintained aspects of early neo-Aristotelian thinking through close reading, which attempts to explore the organization and stylistic structure of a rhetorical object. Using close textual analysis means rhetorical critics use the tools of classical rhetoric and literary analysis to evaluate the style and strategy used to communicate the argument.

Purpose of criticism

Rhetorical criticism serves several purposes or functions. First, rhetorical criticism hopes to help form or improve public taste. It helps educate audiences and develops them into better judges of rhetorical situations by reinforcing ideas of value, morality, and suitability. Rhetorical criticism can thus contribute to the audience's understanding of themselves and society.

According to Jim A. Kuypers, a dual purpose for performing criticism should be primarily to enhance our appreciation and understanding. "[W]e wish to enhance both our own and others' understanding of the rhetorical act; we wish to share our insights with others, and to enhance their appreciation of the rhetorical act. These are not hollow goals, but quality of life issues. By improving understanding and appreciation, the critic can offer new and potentially exciting ways for others to see the world. Through understanding we also produce knowledge about human communication; in theory this should help us to better govern our interactions with others." Criticism is a humanizing activity in that it explores and highlights qualities that make us human."

Animal rhetoric 
Rhetoric is practiced by social animals in a variety of ways. For example, birds use song, various animals warn members of their species of danger, chimpanzees have the capacity to deceive through communicative keyboard systems, and deer stags compete for the attention of mates. While these might be understood as rhetorical actions (attempts at persuading through meaningful actions and utterances), they can also be seen as rhetorical fundamentals shared by humans and animals. The study of animal rhetoric has been described as biorhetorics.

The self-awareness required to practice rhetoric might be difficult to notice and acknowledge in some animals. However, some animals are capable of acknowledging themselves in a mirror, and therefore, they might be understood to be self-aware and engaged in rhetoric when practicing some form of language, and therefore, rhetoric.

Anthropocentrism plays a significant role in human-animal relationships, reflecting and perpetuating binaries in which humans are assumed to be beings that "have" extraordinary qualities while animals are regarded as beings that "lack" those qualities. This dualism is manifested through other forms as well, such as reason and sense, mind and body, ideal and phenomenon in which the first category of each pair (reason, mind, and ideal) represents and belongs to only humans. By becoming aware of and overcoming these dualistic conceptions including the one between humans and animals, human knowledge of themselves and the world is expected to become more complete and holistic. The relationship between humans and animals (as well as the rest of the natural world) is often defined by the human rhetorical act of naming and categorizing animals through scientific and folk labeling. The act of naming partially defines the rhetorical relationships between humans and animals, though both may be understood to engage in rhetoric beyond human naming and categorizing.

Contrary to the binary assumptions deriving from anthropocentrism, which regarded animals as creatures without extraordinarily qualities, it does exist some specific animals with a sort of phrónēsis which confers them capabilities to "learn and receive instruction" with rudimentary understanding of some significant signs. Those animals do practice deliberative, judicial, and epideictic rhetoric deploying ethos, logos, and pathos with gesture and preen, sing and growl. Since animals offer models of rhetorical behavior and interaction that are physical, even instinctual, but perhaps no less artful, getting rid of our accustomed focus on verbal language and consciousness concepts will help people interested in rhetoric and communication matters promote human-animals' rhetoric.

Comparative rhetoric 
Comparative rhetoric is a practice and methodology that developed in the late twentieth century to broaden the study of rhetoric beyond the dominant rhetorical tradition that has been constructed and shaped in western Europe and the U.S. As a research practice, comparative rhetoric studies past and present cultures across the globe to reveal diversity in the uses of rhetoric and to uncover rhetorical perspectives, practices, and traditions that have been historically underrepresented or dismissed. As a methodology, comparative rhetoric constructs a culture's rhetorical perspectives, practices, and traditions on their own terms, in their own contexts, as opposed to using European or American theories, terminology, or framing.

Comparative rhetoric is comparative in that it illuminates how rhetorical traditions relate to one another, while seeking to avoid binary depictions or value judgments. These relationalities can reveal issues of power within and between cultures as well as new or under-recognized ways of thinking, doing, and being that challenge or enrich the dominant Euro-American tradition and provide a fuller account of rhetorical studies.

Robert T. Oliver is credited as the first scholar who recognized the need to study non-Western rhetorics in his 1971 publication Communication and Culture in Ancient India and China. George A. Kennedy has also been credited for publishing the first cross-cultural overview of rhetoric in his 1998 publication Comparative Rhetoric: An Historical and Cross-cultural Introduction. Though Oliver's and Kennedy's works contributed to the birth of comparative rhetoric, given the newness of the field, they both used Euro-American terms and theories to interpret non-Euro-American cultures' practices.

LuMing Mao, Xing Lu, Mary Garrett, Arabella Lyon, Bo Wang, Hui Wu, and Keith Lloyd have published extensively on comparative rhetoric, helping to shape and define the field. In 2013, LuMing Mao edited a special issue on comparative rhetoric in Rhetoric Society Quarterly , focusing on comparative methodologies in the age of globalization. In 2015, LuMing Mao and Bo Wang coedited a symposium Manifesting a Future for Comparative Rhetoric in Rhetoric Review , featuring position essays by a group of leading scholars in the field. In their introduction, Mao and Wang emphasize the fluid and cross-cultural nature of rhetoric, "Rhetorical knowledge, like any other knowledge, is heterogeneous, multidimentional, and always in the process of being created." The symposium includes "A Manifesto: The What and How of Comparative Rhetoric," demonstrating the first collective effort to identify and articulate comparative rhetoric's definition, goals, and methodologies. The tenets of this manifesto are engaged in many later works that study or utilize comparative rhetoric.

Automatic detection of rhetorical figures 
As natural language processing has developed since the late nineties, so has interest in automatically detecting rhetorical figures. The major focus has been to detect specific figures, such as chiasmus, epanaphora, and epiphora using classifiers trained with labeled data. A major shortcoming to achieving high accuracy with these systems is the shortage of labeled data for these tasks, but with recent advances in language modeling, such as few shot learning, it may be possible to detect more rhetorical figures with less data.

Academic journals 
 Argumentation and Advocacy
 College Composition and Communication
 College English
 Enculturation
 Harlot
 Kairos
 Peitho
 Present Tense
 Relevant Rhetoric
 Rhetoric & Public Affairs
 Rhetoric Review
 Rhetoric Society Quarterly (RSQ)
 XChanges

See also 

 Artes liberales
 Casuistry
 Civic humanism
 Chironomia
 Composition studies
 Conversation theory
 Critical thinking
 Demagogy
 Digital rhetoric
 Discourse
 Discourse analysis
 Formal fallacy
 Figure of thought
 Glossary of rhetorical terms
 Grammarian (Greco-Roman world)
 Language and thought
 Multimodality
 New rhetoric
 Pedagogy
 Persuasion technology
 Phenomenology
 Psychological manipulation
 Propaganda
 Rhetoric of science
 Rhetoric of health and medicine
 Rhetorical operations
 Rhetorical reason
 Rogerian argument
 Rule of three
 Semiology
 Speechwriter
 Technical communication

Miscellaneous terms 

 Ad captandum
 Allusion
 Antimetabole
 Aphesis
 Apologue
 Aposiopesis
 Archaism
 Atticism
 Brachyology
 Cacophony
 Catachresis
 Chiasmus
 Circumlocution
 Climax
 Conceit
 Dynamic and formal equivalence
 Eloquence
 Enthymeme
 Euphemism
 Figure of speech
 Hendiadys
 Hysteron proteron
 Idiom
 Innuendo
 Ipse dixit
 Kenning
 Literary topos
 Mediation
 Merism
 Metanoia
 Negation
 Parable
 Paraphrase
 Paraprosdokian
 Pericope
 Period
 Perissologia
 Praeteritio
 Proverb
 Representation
 Rhetorical device
 Rhetorical stance
 Rhetorical velocity
 Soundbite
 Synchysis
 Synesis
 Synonymia
 Tautology
 Tertium comparationis
 Truism
 Word play

Political speech resources 

 List of political slogans
 List of speeches

Notes

References

Citations

Sources 

Primary sources
The locus classicus for Greek and Latin primary texts on rhetoric is the Loeb Classical Library of the Harvard University Press, published with an English translation on the facing page.
 Aristotle. Rhetoric.
 Cicero. De Inventione. Latin only.
 —. De Oratore. Latin only.
 Demosthenes. Orations. Greek. English.
 Cornificius. De Ratione Dicendi. Latin only.
 Isocrates. Against the Sophists.
 Henry Peacham. The Garden of Eloquence.
 George Puttenham. The Arte of Poesie. at Representative Poetry Online
 Quintilian. Institutio oratoria.
 Johannes Susenbrotus. Epitome troporum.
 Thomas Wilson. The Arte of Rhetorique.

Secondary sources

 Ralf van Bühren: Die Werke der Barmherzigkeit in der Kunst des 12.–18. Jahrhunderts. Zum Wandel eines Bildmotivs vor dem Hintergrund neuzeitlicher Rhetorikrezeption (Studien zur Kunstgeschichte, vol. 115), Hildesheim / Zürich / New York: Verlag Georg Olms 1998. .
 Bernard K. Duffy and Martin Jacobi:  The Politics of Rhetoric: Richard Weaver and the Conservative Tradition (Westport, CT: Greenwood Press, 1993). .
 Eugene Garver, Aristotle's Rhetoric: An Art of Character (University of Chicago Press, 1994) .
 Lisa Jardine, Francis Bacon: Discovery and the Art of Discourse (Cambridge University Press, 1975)
 Charles U. Larson, Persuasion Reception and Responsibility Twelfth Edition, Wadsworth Cengage Learning (2012)
 Jacqueline de Romilly, The Great Sophists in Periclean Athens (French orig. 1988; English trans. Clarendon Press/Oxford University Press, 1992).
 William Safire, Lend Me Your Ears: Great Speeches in History (2004) .
 Amelie Oksenberg Rorty, Aristotle's Rhetoric Los Angeles, United States of America (1996).

Further reading
 Andresen, Volker. Speak Well in Public – 10 Steps to Succeed. .
 Connors, Robert, Lisa S. Ede, and Andrea Lunsford, eds. Essays on Classical Rhetoric and Modern Discourse. Festschrift in Honor of Edward P. J. Corbett. Carbondale: Southern Illinois Univ. Press, 1984.
 .
 Duffy, Bernard K. and Richard Leeman. eds. American Voices: An Encyclopedia of Contemporary Orators (Westport, CT: Greenwood, 2005). 
 Garver, Eugene. Aristotle's Rhetoric: On Art of Character. Chicago: University of Chicago Press, 1995. 
 Gunderson, Erik. The Cambridge Companion to Ancient Rhetoric. Cambridge, UK: Cambridge Univ. Press, 2009.
 Howell, Wilbur Samuel. Eighteenth-Century British Logic and Rhetoric. Princeton, NJ: Princeton Univ. Press, 1971. 
 Jansinski, James. Sourcebook on Rhetoric. Sage Publications, Inc. 2001. 
 Kennedy, George A. Aristotle, On Rhetoric. Oxford: Oxford University Press, 1991.
 Kennedy, George A. Classical Rhetoric and its Christian and Secular Tradition from Ancient to Modern Times. Chapel Hill: Univ. of North Carolina Press, 1980.
 Kuypers, Jim A. ed. Purpose, Practice, and Pedagogy in Rhetorical Criticism (Lanham, MD: Lexington Press, 2014).  
 Kuypers, Jim A. and Andrew King. Twentieth-Century Roots of Rhetorical Studies (Westport, CT: Praeger, 2001). 
 MacDonald, Michael, ed. The Oxford Handbook of Rhetorical Studies. Oxford Handbooks. New York: Oxford Univ. Press, 2017.
 Mateus, Samuel. Introdução à Retórica no Séc. XXI. Covilhã, Livros Labcom, 2018 
 Pernot, Laurent. Rhetoric in Antiquity. Washington, DC: Catholic Univ. of America Press, 2005.
 .
 Rorty, Amélie Oksenberg (ed.). Essays on Aristotle's Rhetoric. Berkeley (CA): University of California Press, 1996. 
 Sloane, Thomas O. Encyclopedia of Rhetoric. Oxford: Oxford Univ. Press, 2001.
 Steel, Catherine. Roman Oratory. Greece & Rome New Surveys in the Classics 36. Cambridge, UK: Cambridge Univ. Press, 2006.
 Vickers, Brian.In Defence of Rhetoric. Oxford: Clarendon, 1998.
 Walker, Jeffrey. Rhetoric and Poetics in Antiquity. New York: Oxford Univ. Press, 2000.

External links

 American Rhetoric: The Power of Oratory in the United States.
 Brian Vickers on Rhetoric in the Cambridge Companion to English Poetry
 Wikibooks: Rhetoric and Composition
 
 Mitchell, Anthony. A Primer for Business Rhetoric.  Discusses how messages are dumbed down to make them acceptable to wide audiences.
 Newall, Paul. An introduction to Rhetoric and Rhetorical Figures. Aimed at beginners.
 Técnica Retórica- um blog para oradores
 Rhetoric, BBC Radio 4 discussion with Angie Hobbs, Thomas Healy & Ceri Sullivan (In Our Time, Oct. 28, 2004)

 
Applied linguistics
Communication studies
Critical thinking skills
History of logic
History of philosophy
Intellectual history
Narratology
Philosophical logic
Philosophy of logic
Philosophy of language